Aquilaria beccariana is a species of plant in the Thymelaeaceae family. It is found in Indonesia and Malaysia. It is threatened by habitat loss.

References

beccariana
Vulnerable plants
Taxonomy articles created by Polbot